is a town located in Takaoka District, Kōchi Prefecture, Japan. , the town had an estimated population of 15‚917 in 8196 households, and a population density of 25 persons per km².

Geography
Shimanto Town is located in southwestern Kōchi Prefecture on the island of Shikoku. It is on the middle reaches of the Shimanto River, and faces the Pacific Ocean (Tosa Bay) to the east, and borders Ehime Prefecture across the Shikoku Mountains to the northwest.

Neighbouring municipalities 
Kōchi Prefecture
 Shimanto City
 Kuroshio
 Nakatosa
 Tsuno
 Yusuhara
Ehime Prefecture
 Kihoku
 Matsuno

Climate
Shimanto has a humid subtropical climate (Köppen climate classification Cfa) with hot, humid summers and cool winters. There is significant precipitation throughout the year, especially during June and July.

Demographics
Per Japanese census data, the population of Shimanto in 2020 is 15,607 people. Shimanto has been conducting censuses since 1920.

History 
As with all of Kōchi Prefecture, the area of Shimanto Town was part of ancient Tosa Province.  During the Edo period, the area was part of the holdings of Tosa Domain ruled by the Yamauchi clan from their seat at Kōchi Castle. Following the Meiji restoration, the village of Kubokawa was established within Takaoka District, Kōchi with the creation of the modern municipalities system on October 1, 1889 and was raised to town status on February 11, 1926. Likewise, the village of Higashi-Kamiyama (東上山村) was established within Hata District, Kōchi, was renamed Taishō village on January 1, 1914, and was raised to town status on August 1, 1947. The town of Shimanto was formed on March 20, 2006 from the merger of the towns of Kubokawa and Taishō, and the village of Towa.

Government
Shimanto has a mayor-council form of government with a directly elected mayor and a unicameral town council of 18 members. Shimanto, together with Nakatosa, Yusuhara and Tsuno, contributes two members to the Kōchi Prefectural Assembly. In terms of national politics, the town is part of Kōchi 2nd district of the lower house of the Diet of Japan.

Economy
The local economy is dominated by agriculture, forestry and commercial fishing, and tourism. The town is one of the largest producers of ginger in Japan.

Education
Shimanto Town has 12 public elementary schools and three public middle schools operated by the town government, and two public high schools operated by the Kōchi Prefectural Board of Education.

Transportation

Railway
 Shikoku Railway Company - Dosan Line
 -  -  - 
 Shikoku Railway Company - Yodo Line
 -  -  -  -  -  - 
Tosa Kuroshio Railway - Nakamura Line
  -

Highways 
  Kōchi Expressway

Sister city relations
 - Gochang County, South Korea, friendship city since April 2, 2012

Local attractions
Iwamoto-ji, 37th temple on the Shikoku Pilgrimage

Noted people from Shimanto Town
Tani Tateki, general, Imperial Japanese Army

References

External links

Shimanto official website 

Towns in Kōchi Prefecture
Populated coastal places in Japan